Muricopsis (Muricopsis) mcleani is a species of sea snail, a marine gastropod mollusk in the family Muricidae, the murex snails or rock snails.

Description

Muricopsis (Muricopsis) mcleani Wiedrick, 2009 is a minute marine mollusk from the family Muricidae, subfamily Muricopsinae and in found in the Panamic Province.  In comparison to other similar species in the genus, from this region, M. (M.) mcleani is moderately sized, has one tabulate whorl, varices sharp, bladelike and three dark brown bands on a tan background.

Distribution

Distribution is from San Carlos, Sonora, Mexico, southwest to Mulege, Baja California Sur and south to Espiritu Santo Island, Gulf of California; Isla Santa Cruz, Galapagos Islands, intertidal to 82 m.

References

Muricidae
Gastropods described in 2009